The Australian Venture is an event for Australian Venturer Scouts. It is their equivalent of a Jamboree, but for Venturers there is a lot more freedom and latitude in what they do. There is a number of on site activities and also an off site expedition, normally totaling about 12 days long.

The last Australian Venture was in Brisbane, Queensland, 2018. The theme for this Venture was "Get Set" and it was the 17th Australian Venture.

Past Ventures

1965-66 - National Senior Scout Venture, Perth, Western Australia (presumably the 1st National Venture).
1969-70 - 2nd Australian Venture, Nunawading, Victoria.
1972-73 - 3rd Australian Venture, BP Park, Samford, Queensland.
1975-76 - 4th Australian Venture, Camp Cottermouth, Canberra, Australian Capital Territory.
1978-79 - 5th Australian Venture, Victoria Park, South Australia.
1981-82 - 6th Australian Venture, Nunawading, Victoria.
1985 – 7th Australian Venture, VentureWest, Sorrento, Western Australia.
1991 – 8th Australian Venture, AV8, Tasmania.
1994 – 9th Australian Venture, 9AV, Karingal, Mt. Cotton, Queensland.
1997 – 10th Australian Venture, Mega 10, Adelaide Showgrounds, Wayville and Woodhouse Scout Centre, Piccadilly, South Australia.
2000 – 11th Australian Venture, Venture 2000, Anglesea, Victoria.
2003 – 12th Australian Venture, Extreme Venture, Camp Cottermouth, Australian Capital Territory.
2006 – 13th Australian Venture, AV06, Cataract Park, Sydney, New South Wales.
2009 - 14th Australian Venture, Escape, Fairbridge Village, Pinjarra, Western Australia.
2012 - 15th Australian Venture, Wild Dayz, Tasmania.
2015 - 16th Australian Venture, Heaps Good, Woodhouse Scout Centre, Piccadilly, South Australia.
2018 - 17th Australian Venture, Get Set, Camp Warrawee, Brisbane, Queensland.
2021 - 18th Australian Venture, Oz Venture 2021, Sydney, New South Wales. **Cancelled due to the Covid-19 Pandemic**

See also

 Venture Scout
 Venturing (Boy Scouts of America)
 Australian Scout Jamboree

External links
AV2018 - 17th Australian Venture
Venturers -  Scouts South Australia
Venturers - Scouts Victoria
Venturers - Scouts New South Wales
Venturers - Scouts Queensland
Venturers - Western Australia
Venturers - Scouts Tasmania
Venturers - Scouts Australian Capital Territory
Venturers - Scouts Northern Territory
Australian Queen Scout Association
Scouts Australia

Scouting and Guiding in Australia